Hayk Bzhishkian (Persian هایک پزشکیان, Russian: Гайк Бжишкян, also known as Guy Dmitrievich Guy, Gai Dmitrievich Gai (Гай Дмитриевич Гай), Gaya Gai (Гая Гай), or Bzhishkyan,  – 11 December 1937), was a Soviet military commander of Armenian origin who fought in the Russian Civil War and Polish-Soviet War.

Biography
Bzhishkian was born in Tabriz, Iran, to a family of teachers. His mother was Persian and his father was an Armenian socialist (a member of the Armenian Social Democrat Hnchakian Party) who had taken refuge from the tsarist authorities in Persia during the 1880s. He returned to Russia in his teens and was an activist and journalist in Tiflis, where he studied at the Armenian Theological Seminary. He joined the Russian Social Democratic Labor Party in 1904 and spent five years in jail for revolutionary activities before he was drafted in 1914. Because of his background, Gai was assigned to the Russo-Ottoman front, where his repeated acts of bravery under fire earned him the rank of stabs-kapitan, the Cross of St. George (3rd and 4th class), and the Order of St. Anna, all awarded by General Nikolai Yudenich. Captured by the Ottomans, he escaped and returned to Russia badly wounded on the eve of the February Revolution. During World War I, Bzhishkian rose to the rank of captain. Gai, as he came to be known, became a Bolshevik before the October Revolution. (Lincoln, p. 413) He became a military commander in 1918, when he fought against the Czech Legion ("White Czechs") and the Orenburg Cossacks of ataman Alexander Dutov.

During the Polish–Soviet War of 1920, he helped Mikhail Tukhachevsky drive the Poles back to Warsaw. Gai was appointed commander of the III Cavalry Corps ("Kavkor"), attached to the Fourth Army, and consisting of the 10th Division (N. D. Tomin) and the 15th (Kuban) Division (V. I. Matuzenko), with the 164th Rifle Brigade in support. In Tukhachevsky's plan, the role assigned to the Kavkor was "of the utmost importance". It was to operate on the extreme right wing of the Soviet advance and turn the flank of the Polish defence lines, thus allowing them to be rolled up by the attacking armies. The Kavkor advanced rapidly, taking Vilnius on July 14, Grodno (where the Red cavalry encountered tanks for the first time) on July 22, reaching the Vistula in the second week of August, and cutting the crucial Warsaw-Gdańsk railway.

However, the Polish counter-attack resulted in the encirclement of the Fourth Army. Gai's Kavkor attempted to break out. After several engagements, it was finally pinned against the German (East Prussian) border by the pursuing Poles. The Kavkor crossed the border on August 26, and Gai was interned by the Germans in the Salzwedel camp near Berlin.

Bzhishkian was the People's Commissar of the Army and Navy of the Armenian SSR and later a military history lecturer and researcher in 1922. From 1924 to 1925, he was the chief of the military garrison in Minsk. In 1926, he continued his studies at the Military Academy of the General Staff. Upon graduation in 1927, Bzhishkian managed the Frunze department. He was a professor and the Head of the Department of War History and Military Art in the Zhukovsky Air Force Engineering Academy from 1933 to 1935.

He was twice awarded with the Order of the Red Banner; in 1919 for battles in the Volga Region of 1918 and in 1920 for the Polish campaign.

Arrest and death
In June 1935, he was dismissed from all his posts and the army and was also expelled from the Communist party. On 3 July 1935, he was arrested and accused of "creating a military-fascist organization in the Red Army" by the Military Collegium of the Supreme Court of the USSR. He was also accused of having a private conversation with a non-party member while drunk and stating, "it is necessary to remove Stalin". On 15 October 1935, Bzhishkian was sentenced by the Special Council of the NKVD on charges of involvement in a counter-revolutionary group to 5 years in detention camps. While being sent to the Yaroslavl prison on 22 October 1935, he escaped, but after a few days he was arrested by the NKVD.

He spent two years in detention. On 11 December 1937, during the Great Purge, Bzhishkian was shot. His books were declared politically harmful and banned. After Stalin's death, he was rehabilitated on 21 January 1956 and restored to the party posthumously.

Memory

The town of Gai, Armenia, was renamed in his honor. A USSR postage stamp of Bzhishkian's portrait was made in 1967. The passenger river motor ship (riverboat) Komdiv Gai (Комдив Гай, 1963) bears his name, although according to his rank, it should be Komkor Gai, as Gai was a Commander of Corps. There are streets named after him in the cities of Grodno, Minsk, Samara, Orenburg and Stary Oskol. Guy Boulevard in Togliatti is also named for Bzhishkian.

Honors and awards
Russian Empire

Soviet Union

Bzhishkian was also made an honorary citizen of Minsk.

Commands
Hayk Bzhishkian commanded some regiments, divisions and higher military formations:

July–November 1918: 1st Samara Infantry Division, transformed into 24th Rifle Division that took over Simbirsk (Ulyanovsk) and was later known as "Samara-Ulyanovsk Iron Division".
January–May, 1919: 1st Army (RSFSR)
August–September 1919: 42nd Rifle Division
September 1919-March 1920: 1st Caucasus Cavalry Division
During the Polish-Soviet War he commanded the 2nd Cavalry Corps and (from June or July) 3rd Cavalry Corps, also known as "Kavkor", on the right flank of the Western Front. In August 1920 he covered  the retreat of the 4th Army and was interned in East Prussia
1923—1924: 7-th Cavalry Division (Georgy Zhukov served under his command and highly praised him later in his memoirs).

Name
Hayk's first name is sometimes given as Gaia, Гая, or Gai, as well as Ghaia or Ghai; the patronymic is sometimes spelt as "Dimitrievich" or "Dimitriyevich" or "Dmitriyevich"; the last name also spelt as Bzhishkiants (Бжишкянц); in Polish sources related to Polish-Soviet War he is referred to as either Gaj Brzyszkian, Gaj Dimitrijewicz Gaj or Gaj-Chan (Khan), or Gay-Khan (English spelling). His first name, Гайк, is a Russian transliteration of "Haik", which was further corrupted in various Latinizations.

Works
Первый удар по Колчаку (The first shot on Kolchak). Leningrad, 1926.
На Варшаву! Действия 3 конного корпуса на Западном фронте (At Warsaw Action 3 Cavalry Corps on the Western Front). Moscow, Leningrad, 1928.
В боях за Симбирск (In the battle for Simbirsk). Ulyanovsk, 1928.

References

Bibliography
W. Bruce Lincoln, Red Victory (1989, repr. 1999)
Norman Davies, White Eagle, Red Star (1972), 

Bzhishkyan, Gayk
Bzhishkyan, Gayk
People from Tabriz
Iranian people of Armenian descent
Russian people of Armenian descent
Soviet komkors
Soviet rehabilitations
Great Purge victims from Armenia
Executed Iranian people
Iranian emigrants to the Soviet Union
Iranian emigrants to the Russian Empire
Russian people of Iranian descent
Executed Soviet people
Recipients of the Cross of St. George
Recipients of the Order of St. Anna
Recipients of the Order of the Red Banner
Russian military personnel of World War I
People of the Polish–Soviet War
Soviet people of Iranian descent
Nersisian School alumni
People of the First Republic of Armenia
Soviet Armenians
Members of the Communist Party of the Soviet Union executed by the Soviet Union